Halecia is a genus of beetles in the family Buprestidae, containing the following species:

 Halecia acutipennis (Laporte & Gory, 1837)
 Halecia allecto Obenberger, 1958
 Halecia angulosa (Chevrolat, 1838)
 Halecia angustivertex Obenberger, 1958
 Halecia asperata Bellamy, 1991
 Halecia auropunctata Kerremans, 1897
 Halecia bahiana Kerremans, 1897
 Halecia batesii Saunders, 1874
 Halecia bicolor Saunders, 1874
 Halecia blandula Obenberger, 1958
 Halecia caesia (Gory, 1840)
 Halecia chrysodemoides Saunders, 1874
 Halecia cicatricosa Kerremans, 1908
 Halecia cleteriformis Théry, 1930
 Halecia cocosae Bellamy, 1986
 Halecia cognata Thomson, 1878
 Halecia corinthia (Gory, 1840)
 Halecia costata Saunders, 1874
 Halecia costuligera Obenberger, 1958
 Halecia cupreosignata Waterhouse, 1882
 Halecia cuprina Kerremans, 1897
 Halecia cyanea Théry, 1908
 Halecia debyi Waterhouse, 1889
 Halecia decemimpressa (Chevrolat, 1838)
 Halecia deliciosa Kerremans, 1919
 Halecia demuthi Théry, 1930
 Halecia episcopalis Obenberger, 1922
 Halecia equadorica Obenberger, 1958
 Halecia erosa Kerremans, 1909
 Halecia fulgidipes Lucas, 1858
 Halecia gounellei Kerremans, 1897
 Halecia granulosa Théry, 1908
 Halecia humboldti Obenberger, 1958
 Halecia ignicollis Théry, 1923
 Halecia igniventris Saunders, 1874
 Halecia impressa (Fabricius, 1775)
 Halecia impressipennis Lucas, 1857
 Halecia iridea (Mannerheim, 1837)
 Halecia jacobi Obenberger, 1958
 Halecia jousselini (Laporte & Gory, 1837)
 Halecia lacordairei Thomson, 1878
 Halecia laticollis Waterhouse, 1889
 Halecia maculicollis Saunders, 1872
 Halecia maculipennis (Laporte & Gory, 1837)
 Halecia maculiventris Obenberger, 1958
 Halecia mexicana Kerremans, 1909
 Halecia moneta Kerremans, 1908
 Halecia monticola Kirsch, 1866
 Halecia muelleri Obenberger, 1958
 Halecia nigriventris Théry, 1930
 Halecia octopunctata (Fabricius, 1801)
 Halecia olivacea Théry, 1908
 Halecia onorei Cobos, 1990
 Halecia parallela Saunders, 1874
 Halecia picticeps Saunders, 1874
 Halecia pictifrons Kerremans, 1908
 Halecia prosternalis Obenberger, 1958
 Halecia pseudotrisulcata Obenberger, 1958
 Halecia puncticollis Thomson, 1878
 Halecia punctuliventris Obenberger, 1958
 Halecia purpuriventris Théry, 1908
 Halecia quadricostata Obenberger, 1958
 Halecia quadriimpressa Thomson, 1878
 Halecia rugicollis Saunders, 1874
 Halecia rugipennis (Laporte & Gory, 1837)
 Halecia rugosa Waterhouse, 1905
 Halecia seraphini Théry, 1930
 Halecia sexfoveata (Chevrolat, 1838)
 Halecia simplex Kirsch, 1873
 Halecia smaragdiventris Obenberger, 1958
 Halecia soror Waterhouse, 1905
 Halecia spinolae (Gory, 1840)
 Halecia sternalis Kerremans, 1900
 Halecia stuarti Théry, 1930
 Halecia subsimilis (Mannerheim, 1837)
 Halecia sulcicollis (Dalman, 1823)
 Halecia trilineata Waterhouse, 1905
 Halecia tristicula Obenberger, 1922
 Halecia trisulcata (Laporte & Gory, 1837)
 Halecia ventralis (Laporte & Gory, 1837)
 Halecia verecunda Chevrolat, 1867
 Halecia violaceiventris Obenberger, 1924
 Halecia viridipes Lucas, 1857
 Halecia viridisplendens Waterhouse, 1905
 Halecia zikani Obenberger, 1958

References

Buprestidae genera